is an underground railway station on the Tsukuba Express line in the Asakusa district of Taito, Tokyo, Japan, operated by the private railway operator Metropolitan Intercity Railway Company. It is numbered "TX03".

While this station is situated relatively close to the station complex of the same name serving the Ginza Line, the Asakusa Line and Tobu Railway, there are no transfer passageways between these two stations. Passengers transferring between these stations must transfer at street level, as the latter station is located 600 meters to the east.

Lines
Asakusa Station is served by the Tsukuba Express from Akihabara to Tsukuba.

Station layout
The station has a single underground island platform located on the fourth basement ("B4F") level.

Platforms

History
The station opened on August 24, 2005.

Surrounding area
The station is about 300m west of Sensō-ji temple.

The Rox department store can be reached from the southeast of the station, and the Asakusa View Hotel is located at the northeast corner of the station. The station is also surrounded by a variety of restaurants, theaters, pachinko parlors and the Hanayashiki amusement park.

External links
 TX Asakusa Station 

Railway stations in Tokyo
Stations of Tsukuba Express
Asakusa
Railway stations in Japan opened in 2005